Neil or Neal Jones may refer to:

Neal Jones (born 1960), American actor
Neil R. Jones (1909–1988), American author
Neil Jones (cricketer) (born 1966), Australian cricketer
Neil Jones (footballer) (born 1982), football coach and former New Zealand international footballer
Neil Jones (academic), English legal historian at the University of Cambridge
Neil D. Jones (born 1941), American computer scientist at the University of Copenhagen
Neil Jones (screenwriter), co-creator of the 2011 TV series Bedlam
Neil Jones (dancer) (born 1982), British professional dancer on Strictly Come Dancing
Neil Jones, a minor character in True Blood